is a Japanese marketing event that occurs on 11 November each year. The event uses the Ezaki Glico products Pocky and Pretz, which are both long and thin biscuits, to represent the repeated number 1 in the numerical date (i.e. the 11th day of the 11th month). Ezaki Glico has deployed an advertising campaign surrounding the date each year since 1999.

Guinness World Record 
On 11 November 2012, the campaign attempted to set a world record for the "Most mentions of a brand name on Twitter in 24 hours". "Pocky" was mentioned 1,843,733 times that day and the new record was certified by the Guinness World Records. The record was surpassed the following year when it reached 3,710,044 mentions on 11 November 2013.

See also
 Pepero Day, a similar event in South Korea, held on the same day

References 

November observances
Japanese cuisine